Jaime Janer (20 May 1900 – 3 October 1941) was a Spanish racing cyclist. He rode in the 1920 Tour de France.

References

External links
 

1900 births
1941 deaths
Spanish male cyclists
Place of birth missing
Sportspeople from Terrassa
Cyclists from Catalonia